is a former Grand Prix motorcycle road racer from Japan. He began his Grand Prix career in 1962. Morishita enjoyed his best seasons in 1963 and 1964 when he finished in fourth place in the 50cc world championships.

References 

Japanese motorcycle racers
50cc World Championship riders
125cc World Championship riders
Isle of Man TT riders
Year of birth missing (living people)
Living people